Rossato is a surname of Italian origin said to have come from the northern regions of Italy notably the region of Piedmont, not to be confused with Rosato another similar surname of Italian origin. Rossato is Latin for red man or man of red complexion. Due to large amounts of ethnic Italians migrating out of the country within recent history it is common to find this surname in other parts of the world with notable Italian minorities e.g Brazil. Notable people with the surname include:

Adriano Rossato (born 1977), Brazilian retired footballer
Altamiro Rossato (1925–2014), Brazilian Roman Catholic prelate and Archbishop Emeritus of the Roman Catholic Archdiocese of Porto Alegre
Beatrice Rossato (born 1996),  Italian professional racing cyclist
Nivaldo Luiz Rossato (born 1951), senior officer of the Brazilian Air Force and its current commander